The St. Louis Bay Bridge is a bridge in the U.S. state of Mississippi which carries U.S. Route 90 over Bay of Saint Louis between Bay St. Louis and Pass Christian.  The original bridge was heavily damaged by Hurricane Katrina in August 2005.  The new bridge opened to traffic on May 17, 2007.  The span carries 4 lanes of traffic as well as a  path for pedestrians and bicyclists on the Gulf side of the bridge.

References

Bridges completed in 2007
Road bridges in Mississippi
U.S. Route 90
Bridges of the United States Numbered Highway System
Concrete bridges in the United States
Buildings and structures in Hancock County, Mississippi
Buildings and structures in Harrison County, Mississippi